Punjabi Canadians number approximately 950,000 and account for roughly 2.6% of Canada's population, as per the 2021 Canadian census. Their heritage originates wholly or partly from the Punjab region of India and Pakistan.

Punjabis first arrived in Canada during the late 19th century to work in the forestry industry. Primarily concentrated in the western province of British Columbia, the Punjabi population initially peaked in 1908 before an ensuing period of population decline and stagnation followed. In the mid 20th century Canadian immigration laws were relaxed, fostering rapid population growth into the present day.

Today, the largest Punjabi communities in Canada are situated in the province of British Columbia, concentrated in Vancouver, and the province of Ontario, particularly in Toronto.

History

Late 19th century

In 1897, the first persons of Punjabi origin visited British Columbia. They were soldiers transiting from India to the United Kingdom during the Diamond Jubilee of Queen Victoria. The Punjabis ultimately became the first South Asian-origin group to settle in Canada.

Early 20th century
In 1900, the population of Punjabis in Canada increased to 100. By 1906, this number increased to 1,500. The vast majority were Sikhs and came from Hoshiarpur, Jalandhar, Amritsar, Ferozpur, and Ludhiana. At the turn of the century the Mayor of Vancouver did not permit cremation, so when the first Sikh died in 1907 he could not be cremated in the Vancouver city limits. Christian missionaries did not permit him to be buried with whites. Even though the missionaries promoted burial, the Sikhs instead cremated the man in a distant wilderness. This prompted Sikhs to establish their own religious institutions.

Initially, Punjabis were guaranteed jobs by agents of big Canadian companies like the Canadian Pacific Railway and the Hudson's Bay Company. Overcoming their initial reluctance to go to these countries due to the treatment of Asians by the white population, many young men chose to go, having been assured that they would not meet the same fate. They were British subjects and Canada was a part of the British Empire.

A notable moment in early Punjabi Canadian history was in 1902 when Punjabi Sikh settlers first arrived in Golden, British Columbia to work at the Columbia River Lumber Company. This was a theme amongst most early Punjabi settlers in Canada to find work in the agricultural and forestry sectors in British Columbia. Punjabis became a prominent ethnic group within the sawmill workforce in British Columbia almost immediately after initial arrival to Canada.

The early settlers in Golden built the first Gurdwara (Sikh Temple) in Canada and North America in 1905, which would later be destroyed by fire in 1926. The second Gurdwara to be built in Canada was in 1908 in Kitsilano (Vancouver), aimed at serving a growing number of Punjabi Sikh settlers who worked at nearby sawmills along False Creek at the time. The Gurdwara would later close and be demolished in 1970, with the temple society relocating to the newly built Gurdwara on Ross Street, in South Vancouver.

As a result, the oldest existing Gurdwara in Canada today is the Gur Sikh Temple, located in Abbotsford, British Columbia. Built in 1911, the temple was designated as a national historic site of Canada in 2002 and is the third-oldest Gurdwara in the country. Later, the fourth Gurdwara to be built Canada was established in 1912 in Victoria on Topaz Avenue, while the fifth soon was built at the Fraser Mills (Coquitlam) settlement in 1913, followed a few years later by the sixth at the Queensborough (New Westminster) settlement in 1919, and the seventh at the Paldi (Vancouver Island) settlement, also in 1919.

Oftentimes, upon arrival to British Columbia, early Punjabi immigrants and settlers faced widespread racism by other ethnic groups who had also immigrated and settled in Canada in prior decades, including English Canadians, Scottish Canadians, or Irish Canadians. Most of the white Canadians feared workers who would work for less pay, and that an influx of more immigrants would threaten their jobs. As a result, there were a series of race riots that targeted the Punjabi Sikh immigrants, who were beat up by mobs of angry white Canadians, though often met with retaliation. Nevertheless, during the most infamous anti-Asian riot in BC history (Anti-Oriental Riots of 1907), Punjabis were spared as they remained indoors.

The continued tensions caused the Punjabi population to fall from a high of 4,700 in 1907, to less than 2,000 by 1914. In 1908 the British Columbia government passed a law preventing Indian men from voting. Because eligibility for federal elections originated from provincial voting lists, East Indian men were unable to vote in federal elections.

Punjabis were later faced by one of the most infamous racial exclusion acts in Canadian history. In 1914, The Komagata Maru, a steamliner carrying 376 passengers from Punjab docked in Vancouver. Of them, 24 were admitted to Canada, but the other 352 passengers were not allowed to disembark in Canada, and the ship was forced to return to India. The passengers comprised 337 Punjabi Sikhs, 27 Punjabi Muslims and 12 Punjabi Hindus.

Mid 20th century

By 1923, Vancouver became the primary cultural, social, and religious centre of Punjabi Canadians as it had the largest ethnic Indian population of any city in North America. The Punjabi population in Canada would remain relatively stable throughout the mid 20th century as the exclusionary immigration policies practiced by the Canadian government continued. However, a shift began to occur after World War Two. The Canadian government re-enfranchised the Indo-Canadian community with the right to vote in 1947.

A significant event in Punjabi Canadian history occurred in 1950 when 25 years after settling in Canada and nine years after moving to British Columbia from Toronto, Naranjan "Giani" Singh Grewall became the first individual of Punjabi ancestry in Canada and North America to be elected to public office after successfully running for a position on the board of commissioners in Mission, BC against six other candidates. Grewall was re-elected to the board of commissioners in 1952 and by 1954, was elected to became mayor of Mission. 

A millwright and union official, and known as a sportsman and humanitarian philanthropist as well as a lumberman, Grewall eventually established himself as one of the largest employers and most influential business leaders in the northern Fraser Valley, owned six sawmills and was active in community affairs serving on the boards or as chairman of a variety of organizations, and was instrumental in helping create Mission's municipal tree farm. With strong pro-labour beliefs despite his role as a mill-owner, after a scandal embroiled the provincial Ministry of Forestry under the-then Social Credit party government, he referred to holders of forest management licenses across British Columbia as Timber Maharajahs, and cautioned that within a decade, three or four giant corporations would predominantly control the entire industry in the province, echoing similarities to the archaic zamindar system in South Asia. He later ran unsuccessfully for the Co-operative Commonwealth Federation (the precursor of today's New Democratic Party) in the Dewdney riding in the provincial election of 1956.

While by the 1950s, Punjabi Canadians had gained respect in business in British Columbia primarily for their work in owning sawmills and aiding the development of the provincial forestry industry, racism still existed especially in the upper echelons of society. As such, during the campaign period and in the aftermath of running for MLA in 1956, Grewall received personal threats, while the six mills he owned along with his house were all set ablaze by arsonists. One year later, on July 17, 1957 while on a business trip, he was suspiciously found dead in a Seattle motel, having been shot in the head. Grewall Street in Mission was named in his honour.

During the 1950s, immigration restrictions were loosened and Vancouver remained the centre of Punjabi immigration through the mid-20th century. In the post-war years into the early 1950s, Punjabis were geographically dispersed in the Lower Mainland, however two concentrations soon developed; first in South Vancouver (Sunset neighbourhood) during the late 1950s and throughout the 1960s, followed by South Burnaby (Edmonds neighbourhood). Out of these two newly formed ethnic enclaves, it was South Vancouver which began to flourish as the Punjabi Market was soon founded in the late 1960s.

In 1967 all immigration quotas based on specific ethnic groups were scrapped in Canada, thus allowing the ethnic Punjabi population in Canada to grow rapidly thereafter. Most continued to settle in across British Columbia, notably in the Lower Mainland, Vancouver Island, and the interior. As many Punjabis worked in the forestry industry, interior and northern regions of British Columbia began to see a rise in Punjabi immigration in the 1960s. Prince George, the economic centre of Northern BC, became a secondary hub for early Punjabi immigration.

Later in the 1970s, Punjabi population concentrations began appearing in North Delta, East Richmond, and Surrey. Vandalism against houses owned by Indo-Canadians and a Sikh gurdwara occurred in the 1970s, especially in 1974-1975 in Richmond.

Late 20th century to present
In 1986, following the British Columbia provincial election, Moe Sihota became the first Canadian of Punjabi ancestry to be elected to provincial parliament. Sihota, who was born in Duncan, British Columbia in 1955, ran as the NDP Candidate in the riding of Esquimalt-Port Renfrew two years after being involved in municipal politics, as he was elected as an Alderman for the city of Esquimalt in 1984.

By the 1980s, the traditional Punjabi immigration patterns began to shift. Ontario soon became an important centre of immigration to Canada. Large Punjabi populations began to appear across the Greater Toronto Area, especially in Scarborough, Markham, Mississauga, Brampton, and Ajax. At the same time, Alberta also became another important immigration destination for Punjabis, with the third and fourth largest Punjabi Canadian populations in metropolitan areas now situated in Metro Calgary (primarily Northeast Calgary) and Metro Edmonton (primarily Southeast Edmonton in Mill Woods).

As of the 2011 census, 5.5% of residents reported speaking Punjabi at home in Metro Vancouver, while 21.3% of Surrey residents speak it as their primary language at home.

Today, the Punjabi population of Canada is 942,170 with the largest community located in Ontario (397,865), followed by British Columbia (315,000), and Alberta (126,385). In addition, Punjabi is the third most spoken language of the Parliament of Canada.

Demography

Population

Religion 
During the early stages of Punjabi immigration to Canada, most pioneers were of the Sikh faith.

The last census report detailing the religious proportion breakdown of the Punjabi Canadian community was done between 2005 and 2007 by Statistics Canada, with results derived from the 2001 Canadian census. This report found that 86% of Punjabi Canadians were adherents of the Sikh faith, while the remaining 14% followed other religions such as Hinduism, Islam, or Christianity.

Geographical distribution 
The largest Punjabi populations in Canada are located in British Columbia and Ontario. Alberta, Manitoba, and Quebec are also home to significant populations with Saskatchewan and Nova Scotia featuring small but rapidly growing Punjabi communities.

Provinces & territories

Metropolitan areas 
According to the 2021 census, metropolitan areas with the highest proportions of Punjabi Canadians included Abbotsford–Mission (23.3%), Vancouver (9.2%), Toronto (5.2%), Winnipeg (4.9%), Calgary (4.7%), Edmonton (3.8%), Kitchener–Cambridge–Waterloo (2.8%), Regina (2.5%), Kelowna (2.2%), Hamilton (1.8%), Saskatoon (1.7%), and Victoria (1.5%).

Subdivisions

British Columbia 
According to the 2021 census, subdivisions in British Columbia with the highest proportions of Punjabi Canadians included Surrey (29.3%), Abbotsford (27.3%), Delta (19.4%), Cawston (16.4%), Okanagan−Similkameen Subdivision A (14.9%), Okanagan−Similkameen Subdivision C (14.3%), Mission (8.9%), Oliver (8.4%), Squamish (5.4%), Okanagan−Similkameen Subdivision G (5.4%), and New Westminster (5.1%). 
 Subdivisions with Punjabi Canadian populations greater than 100 listed below.

Prairies 
According to the 2021 census, subdivisions in the Prairies with the highest proportions of Punjabi Canadians included Chestermere (14.7%), Winnipeg (5.3%), Edmonton (5.0%), Thompson (4.9%), Calgary (4.7%), Regina (2.7%), Airdrie (2.4%), Saskatoon (2.0%), Portage La Prairie (1.9%), Grande Prairie (1.2%), and Yorkton (1.2%). 
 Subdivisions with Punjabi Canadian populations greater than 100 listed below.

Ontario 
According to the 2021 census, subdivisions in Ontario with the highest proportions of Punjabi Canadians included Brampton (29.1%), Caledon (15.1%), Mississauga (5.3%), Mono (5.0%), Milton (4.6%), Woodstock (4.2%), Cambridge (3.8%), Kitchener (3.2%), Brantford (3.1%), Oakville (2.6%), Ajax (2.3%), Halton Hills (2.1%), and Waterloo (2.0%).

 Subdivisions with Punjabi Canadian populations greater than 100 listed below.

Quebec 
 Subdivisions with Punjabi Canadian populations greater than 100 listed below.

Atlantic

North 
 Subdivisions with Punjabi Canadian populations greater than 100 listed below.

Notable people

Academics
 Hardial Singh Bains, microbiologist
 Harjot Singh Oberoi, academic
 Munir Sheikh, economist
 Naranjan Singh Dhalla, scientist
 Naweed Syed, scientist
 Sajida Alvi, academic 
 Sandeep Singh Brar, academic
 Sat Bir Singh Khalsa, academic
 Sheena Iyengar, academic

Activists
 Darshan Singh Canadian, trade unionist and communist organizer 
 Harmeet Singh Sooden, anti-war activist
 Jaggi Singh, anti-globalization activist
 Mewa Singh, assassin, anti-British Colonialism activist, Azad Punjab(Free Punjab) Movement Ghadarite

Athletes
 Andrew Singh Kooner, boxer
 Akam, professional wrestler
 Amarveer Singh Dhesi, wrestling gold medalist 
 Arjun Singh Bhullar, wrestler and mixed martial artist
 Arjun Gill, wrestling gold medalist 
 Balraj Panesar, field hockey player
 The Bollywood Boyz, Gurv Singh and Harv Singh Sihra, professional wrestling tag team
 Haninder Dhillon, cricket player
 Harinder Jit Singh Rai, field hockey player
 Harpal Singh Talhan, boxer
 Jasvir Rakkar, baseball player
 Jasvir Singh, weightlifter
 Jimmy Hansra, cricket player
 Jinder Mahal, professional wrestler
 Jujhar Khaira, ice hockey player
 Kenny Singh Lally, Boxing bronze medalist 
 Manny Malhotra, retired ice hockey player and current coach
 Nick Sandhu, former field hockey player
 Nicolas Gill, judoko
 Nishan Singh Randhawa, wrestling gold medalist 
 Nuvraj Bassi, football player
 Obby Khan, former football player
 Paul Chohan, former field hockey player
 Qaiser Ali, cricket player 
 Robin Bawa, ice hockey player, first Indo-Canadian in the NHL
 Rizwan Cheema, cricket player
 Saad Bin Zafar, cricket player
 Sim Bhullar, basketball player
 Sukh Chungh, football player
 Sukhdeep Singh Chakria, boxer 
 Sukhi Panesar, field hockey player
 Tiger Ali Singh, professional wrestler
 Tiger Jeet Singh, professional wrestler
 Umar Bhatti, cricket player
 Yogi Singh Johl, Olympic wrestler

Businesspeople
 Nav Bhatia, businessman
 Baljit Singh Chadha, businessman
 Harbanse Singh Doman, industrialist
 Manjit Minhas, entrepreneur, Dragon's Den panelist
 Spoony Singh, entrepreneur
 Suneet Singh Tuli, tech entrepreneur
 Shivon Zilis, venture capitalist

Criminals
 Jaspal Atwal, attempted assassin of Malkiat Singh Sidhu
 Ranjit Cheema, gangster
 Bindy Johal, gangster

Film and Television
 Neeru Bajwa, Pollywood actress
 Rubina Bajwa, Pollywood actress
 Parveen Kaur, actress
 Karam Singh Batth, Pollywood actor and producer
 Rupan Bal, Pollywood actor and YouTube personality
 Vekeana Dhillon, Pollywood screenwriter and series creator
 Vikram Dhillon, filmmaker and producer
 Balinder Johal, actress
 Akshay Kumar, Bollywood actor 
 Sunny Leone, Bollywood and adult actress
 Deepa Mehta, film director
 Omar Majeed, film director and producer
 Zarqa Nawaz, film director/producer and author
 Alex Sangha, social worker and documentary film  producer
 Zaib Shaikh, actor 
 Jasmeet Singh, comedian
 Veena Sood, actress
 Lilly Singh, comedian
Supinder Wraich, actress

Journalists
 Suroosh Alvi, journalist and filmmaker
 Monika Deol, VJ and news anchor
 Tara Singh Hayer, newspaper publisher
 Tarek Fatah, journalist
 Monita Rajpal, journalist
 Ali Amjad Rizvi, journalist and political activist
 Harnarayan Singh, journalist and sports announcer
 Adnan Virk, sports announcer

Musicians
 Jazzy B, singer
 Fateh, rapper
 Humble the Poet, rapper
 Jonita Gandhi, singer
 Qurram Hussain, singer  
 Rup Magon, singer-songwriter
 Deep Jandu, rapper and producer
 Harbhajan Mann, singer, actor, film producer
 Nav, rapper and singer
 Musarrat Nazir, singer/actress
 Sidhu Moose Wala, rapper and singer
 Nimrat Khaira, singer

Politicians
 Amarjeet Singh Sohi , Minister of Natural Resources
 Anita Anand, MP for Oakville, cabinet minister
 Anju Dhillon, MP for Dorval—Lachine—LaSalle
 Bardish Chagger, MP for Waterloo, cabinet minister
 Bob Saroya, MP for Markham—Unionville
 Deepak Anand, politician MPP for Mississauga-Malton
 Gagan Sikand, MP for Mississauga-Streetsville
 Gurbax Singh Malhi, former MP for Bramalea—Gore—Malton, first turban-wearing Sikh elected to a national legislature in the Western world
 Gurmant Grewal, former MP for Newton—North Delta
 Gurratan Singh, MPP for Brampton East
 Harinder Takhar former MPP for Mississauga—Erindale, former cabinet minister
 Harjit Sajjan, MP for Vancouver South, cabinet minister
 Harry Bains, MLA for Surrey-Newton
 Herb Dhaliwal, former MP for Vancouver South, cabinet minister
 Iqra Khalid, MP for Mississauga—Erin Mills
 Jag Sahota, MP for Calgary Skyview
 Jagmeet Singh, MP for Burnaby South, leader of the New Democratic Party
 Jas Johal, former MLA for Richmond-Queensborough
 Jasbir Sandhu, former MP for Surrey North
 Johnder Basran, former Mayor of Lillooet, British Columbia, first Indo-Canadian mayor
 Kamal Khera, MP for Brampton West
 Kash Heed, former police chief and MLA for Vancouver-Fraserview
 Ruby Dhalla, former MP for Brampton—Springdale
 Maninder Sidhu, MP for Brampton East
 Manmeet Bhullar, MLA for Calgary-Greenway
 Mintu Sandhu, MLA for The Maples
 Moe Sihota, former MLA for Esquimalt-Metchosin, first Indo-Canadian elected to a provincial legislature
 Nina Grewal, former MP for Fleetwood—Port Kells
 Navdeep Bains, MP for Mississauga—Malton, cabinet minister
 Parm Gill, MPP for Milton
 Peter Sandhu, former MLA for Edmonton Manning
 Peter Singh, MLA for Calgary-East
 Raj Grewal, former MP for Brampton East
 Raj Saini, MP for Kitchener Centre 
 Rachna Singh, MLA for Surrey-Green Timbers
 Ramesh Sangha, MP for Brampton Centre
 Ruby Sahota, MP for Brampton North
 Sara Singh, MPP for Brampton Centre
 Sukh Dhaliwal, MP for Surrey—Newton
 Shafiq Qaadri, former MPP for Etobicoke North
 Sonia Sidhu, MP for Brampton South
 Tim Uppal, MP for Edmonton Mill Woods, former cabinet minister
 Ujjal Dosanjh, former MP for Vancouver South, former MLA for Vancouver-Kensington, former Premier of British Columbia, first Indo-Canadian premier
 Wajid Khan, former MP for Mississauga—Streetsville
 Wally Oppal, former MLA for Vancouver-Fraserview

Writers and Authors
 Gurjinder Basran, novelist
 H. S. Bhabra, writer
 Navtej Bharati, poet
 Ranj Dhaliwal, novelist
 Rupinder Gill, writer and humourist
 Rupi Kaur, author and poet
 Rukhsana Khan, writer
 Shaun Mehta, writer

Other
 Buckam Singh, former soldier

See also

Indian-Canadians
Pakistani-Canadians

References

Punjabi Canadian
Canadian people of Punjabi descent
Canadian people of Indian descent
Indian diaspora in Canada
Indian diaspora
Canadian people of Pakistani descent
Pakistani diaspora in Canada
Ethnic groups in Canada
Pakistani diaspora